GCS 2000 is a studio album by funk group Graham Central Station released on July 21, 1998, on NPG Records. It was
their first new album in America since 1979's Star Walk.

Background
Prince had greatly boosted the career of another funk artist, Chaka Khan, in 1984 with her platinum-selling album, I Feel for You. In 1998, he tried to revitalize her career with the album Come 2 My House. It was released the same day as GCS 2000 and peaked at #49 R&B.

Prince's attempt to salvage Graham Central Station's status, however, was not as successful, and neither the album nor its singles charted in the U.S. One of the chief issues, as noted by Greg Prato at allmusic, was that "Too much Prince and not enough Graham makes GCS 2000 sound like a Prince solo album with Graham guesting, instead of a triumphant return to form from this trailblazing funk bass great." Another complaint was that the album, in contrast to prior Graham Central Station works, sounded much more like Prince's "studio perfection", whereas the group's prior works sounded "as if they were recorded entirely live".

A quick preview of the album reveals a departure from the slapping technique the band was known for. "Just B My Lady", "Don't Let 'Em Change You", "Groove On", "I Just Found Somebody to Love" and "Outro" (5 of the 12 tracks) all feature several characteristics reminiscent of P-funk's style.

Track listing
All tracks were composed by Larry Graham alone, except for "Utopia", which Prince helped compose:
"Intro"
"GCS 2000"
"Free" (with Chaka Khan and Prince )
"U Move Me"
"Just B My Lady"
"Love 4 1another"
"Don't Let 'Em Change U"
"Utopia"
"Groove On"
"I Just Found Somebody 2 Love"
"I'magettin'" (Instrumental)
"Outro"

Personnel
Larry Graham - bass, vocals
Cynthia Robinson - trumpet
Jerry Martini - saxophone
Gail Mudrow - guitar, vocals
Wilson Rabb - guitar, vocals
Robert "Butch" Sam - organ, vocals
The NPG - additional shouts
Brother Jules - scratches

Production
 Larry Graham
 Prince

References

1998 albums
Graham Central Station albums
Albums produced by Prince (musician)
NPG Records albums